Iditarod is an abandoned town in the Yukon-Koyukuk Census Area in the U.S. state of Alaska. 
It is presently located within the boundaries of the Flat Census Designated Place, which has no residents as of 2010.

History

The town of Iditarod was named after the Iditarod River. Iditarod comes from the Athabascan word Haidilatna.

On Christmas Day 1908, prospectors John Beaton and W.A. "Bill" Dikeman found gold on Otter Creek, a tributary to the Iditarod River.  News of the find spread, and in the summer of 1909 miners arrived in the gold fields and built a small camp that was later known as Flat.  People and supplies traveled to the gold fields by boat from the Yukon River, up the Innoko River, and up the Iditarod River to the current town site, a short walk from Flat.

More gold was discovered, and a massive stampede headed for Flat in 1910.  The steamboat Tanana arrived June 1, 1910, and the city of Iditarod was founded as a head of navigation for all the surrounding gold fields, including Flat, Discovery, Otter, Dikeman, and Willow Creek.  Iditarod quickly became a bustling boomtown, with hotels, cafés, brothels, three newspapers (only one would last the year), a Miners and Merchants Bank, a mercantile store, electricity, telephones, automobiles, and a light railway to Flat.

By 1930 the gold was gone and most of the miners had moved to Flat, taking many of the buildings with them. Iditarod is now a ghost town.  Only one cabin and a handful of ruins remain, including the concrete bank vault from the Miners and Merchants Bank.  There is no remnant of the bank structure.

Demographics

Iditarod first appeared on the 1920 U.S. Census as an incorporated city of just 50 residents, as the boom had already played out. In 1931, it was disincorporated, leaving just a single resident by 1940. It did not report again on the census after that. However, the area was included in the census designated place of Flat beginning in 2000, but with the departure of their remaining residents, the population is now back to zero.

Geography

References

Geography of Yukon–Koyukuk Census Area, Alaska
Ghost towns in Alaska
Unincorporated communities in Alaska
Ghost towns in the United States
Ghost towns in North America
Towns in the United States